Melanella jucunda is a species of sea snail, a marine gastropod mollusk in the family Eulimidae.

Distribution
This marine species occurs off the Agulhas Bank, South Africa.

References

 Thiele J. (1925). Gastropoden der Deutschen Tiefsee-Expedition. II Teil. Wissenschaftliche Ergebnisse der Deutschen Tiefsee-Expedition auf dem Dampfer "Valdivia" 1898-1899. 17(2): 35-382, pls 13-46

External links
 Barnard, K. H. (1963). Contributions to the knowledge of South African marine Mollusca. Part III. Gastropoda: Prosobranchiata: Taenioglossa. i>Annals of the South African Museum 47(1): 1-199

Endemic fauna of South Africa
jucunda
Gastropods described in 1925